Mifflin is a surname. Notable people with the surname include:

Fred Mifflin (1938–2013), retired Rear Admiral in the Canadian Forces and a former politician
James Mifflin (1839–?), United States Navy sailor in the American Civil War
Margot Mifflin, (born 1960), U.S. Author and professor
Ramón Mifflin (born 1947), Peruvian footballer
Thomas Mifflin (1744–1800), American merchant and politician from Philadelphia, Pennsylvania
George Harrison Mifflin (1845–1921), American publisher, co-founder with Henry Oscar Houghton of Houghton Mifflin Company

See also

Mifflin Kenedy (1818-1895), South Texas rancher and steamboat operator